Consbruch is a surname. Notable people with the surname include:

 Joachim von Berenberg-Consbruch (born 1940) (né Joachim von Consbruch), German banker
 Jomaine Consbruch (born 2002), German footballer
 Maximilian Friedrich Julius Consbruch (1866–1927), German philologist
 Paul Consbruch (1930–2012), German Roman Catholic bishop